Theeuwes is a Dutch patronymic surname. Theeuw, Teeuwes, Tewis, Theeuwis etc. are archaic short forms of the given name Matthew/Mattheus. The surname has many variant forms, including Teeuwen and Tewes. Notable people with the surname include:

 Jacques Theeuwes (born 1944), Dutch organizational theorist
 Janus Theeuwes (1886–1975), Dutch archer
 Jules Theeuwes (1944–2012), Belgian economist
 (fl.1560–1585), Flemish harpsichord maker
Marcellin Theeuwes (born 1936), Dutch Carthusian prior
Variant forms
Arjen Teeuwissen (born 1971), Dutch equestrian
Len Teeuws (1927–2006), American football player
Ties Theeuwkens (born 1985), Dutch basketball player
 (born 1953), Dutch historian, medievalist and archaeologist
Thomas Thewes (1931–2008), American business executive
Hans Thewissen (born c.1960), Dutch-born American paleontologist
Rachelle Thiewes (born 1952), American jeweler and metal artist

References

Dutch-language surnames
Patronymic surnames